Lolah Burford (18 March 1931, Dallas, Texas –2002) was an American novelist from Texas. She published six novels, and was married to poet William Burford. She graduated from Bryn Mawr College in 1951.

Novels
Vice Avenged: A Moral Tale (1971)
The Vision of Stephen: An Elegy (1972)
Edward, Edward (1973)
MacLyon (1974)
Alyx (1977)
Seacage (1979)

References

External links
 
Comments on the One Hundred Best Books I Have Ever Read (archived March 2005)

2002 deaths
20th-century American novelists
Novelists from Texas
1931 births
American women novelists
20th-century American women writers